Jano Vermaak (born 1 January 1985) is a South African rugby union footballer.

He made his debut for the Springboks against Italy on 8 June 2013 at Kings Park Stadium in Durban, playing at scrum-half.

References

External links

Bulls profile
itsrugby.co.uk profile

Living people
1985 births
South African rugby union players
South Africa international rugby union players
Rugby union scrum-halves
Bulls (rugby union) players
Blue Bulls players
Golden Lions players
Lions (United Rugby Championship) players
Afrikaner people
People from Graaff-Reinet
University of Johannesburg alumni
Stade Toulousain players
South Africa international rugby sevens players
Rugby union players from the Eastern Cape